The 2014 Louisville mayoral election was the fourth quadrennial Louisville Metro mayoral election, held on Tuesday, November 4, 2014. The Democratic ticket of incumbent mayor and businessman Greg Fischer was elected to his second term. He defeated the Republican ticket of former McCreary County School Board member Bob DeVore.

Declarations
On April 23, 2013, Fischer announced to a group of supporters that he would be running for reelection in the 2014 General Election.

On January 28, 2014, less than a day before the filing deadline, Former McCreary County School Board member Bob DeVore announced his candidacy to challenge Mayor Greg Fischer.  According to Nathan Haney, then-Chairman of the Jefferson County Republican Party, DeVore was not recruited by the party, nor did they have any advanced notice that DeVore was declaring his candidacy.

Primaries
Both candidates went unopposed in their respective primaries.

Results

Greg Fischer, the incumbent Democratic mayor of Louisville, defeated Bob DeVore, a Republican, tallying 68.5% of the vote to DeVore's 31.3%, with 0.002% of the vote going to various write-in candidates such as Jackie Green, who ran as an Independent against Fischer in 2010.

References

2014 Kentucky elections
Louisville
2014
November 2014 events in the United States